In combinatorics, a lattice path  in the -dimensional integer lattice  of length  with steps in the set , is a sequence of vectors  such that each consecutive difference  lies in . 

North-East lattice paths
The  steps are called North steps and denoted by 's;
the  steps are called East steps and denoted by 's.

NE lattice paths most commonly begin at the origin. This convention allows us to encode all the information about a NE lattice path 
in a single permutation word. The length of the word gives us the number of steps of the lattice path, .

If the permutation word for a NE lattice path contains  steps and  

Counting lattice paths
Lattice paths are often used to count other combinatorial objects. Similarly, there are many combinatorial objects that count the number of lattice paths of a certain kind. This occurs when the lattice paths are in bijection with the object in question. For example,

 Dyck paths are counted by the  Catalan number .

Combinations and NE lattice paths
NE lattice paths have close connections to the number of combinations, which are counted by the binomial coefficient, and arranged in Pascal's triangle. The diagram below demonstrates some of these connections.

If one rotates the diagram 135° clockwise about the origin and extend it to include all , one obtains Pascal's triangle. This result is no surprise, because the  entry of the  row of Pascal's Triangle is the binomial coefficient 
.

Problems and proofs
The graphical representation of NE lattice paths lends itself to many bijective proofs involving combinations. Here are a few examples.

 .

On the left-hand side, the binomial coefficient squared, represents two copies of the set of NE lattice paths from
 to  attached endpoint to start point. Rotate the second copy 90° clockwise. This does not change the combinatorics of the object: . So the total number of lattice paths remains the same.

Superimpose the NE lattice paths squared onto the same rectangular array, as seen in the figure below. In particular, notice that any lattice path passing through the red lattice point (for example) is counted by the squared set of lattice paths (also shown in red).

References

Enumerative combinatorics